Everything for Father is a 1953 West German comedy film directed by Karl Hartl and starring Johanna Matz, Curd Jürgens, and Peer Schmidt. It was shot at the Göttingen Studios. The film's sets were designed by the art director Gabriel Pellon.

Cast

References

Bibliography

External links 
 
 

1953 films
1953 comedy films
German comedy films
West German films
1950s German-language films
Films directed by Karl Hartl
German black-and-white films
1950s German films
Films shot at Göttingen Studios